The South Dakota State Penitentiary is a state prison located in South Dakota's largest city, Sioux Falls. The building's industry shop makes several things for the state, including woodwork and license plates. The State Penitentiary also houses South Dakota's death row for men and the state's execution chamber.

History
The South Dakota State Penitentiary is located in northern Sioux Falls, occupying approximately thirty acres. First constructed as a territorial prison in 1881, it became the South Dakota State Penitentiary when South Dakota was granted statehood in 1889. Though a large portion of the original buildings remain, numerous structural changes have occurred over the years. 
The main Penitentiary facility contains three housing units. The G. Norton Jameson Annex began housing inmates in February 1993. The Jameson Annex contains three housing units within a secure perimeter and a minimum security unit known as Unit C, which is located outside the perimeter fence.

Inmate employment within the Penitentiary falls into two basic categories; institutional support and prison industries. Institutional support includes those employed in food service, as clerks for various departments, as cell orderlies and those working in maintenance. Prison Industries consists of upholstery, printing, sign, decal, license plates, carpentry, book bindery, machine shop, Braille unit, garments and data entry. All but the garment and data entry work is done at the Penitentiary. Most of the work is done for government agencies. Inmates are offered literacy, Adult Basic Education and GED classes.

The penitentiary was designed by Wallace L. Dow and constructed in 1882. The warden’s residence was completed in 1884. In the 1890s, prisoners quarried stone to build a wall to enclose the prison yard. In 1881, Richard Pettigrew lobbied for and succeeded in getting a federal appropriation to construct the jail in Sioux Falls, which can be seen from the Big Sioux River.

On July 11, 2007, the first post-Gregg execution took place at the penitentiary. 25-year-old Elijah Page was executed via lethal injection for the murder of Chester Poage. It was the first execution carried out in South Dakota in over sixty years.

On April 12, 2011, Correctional Officer Ronald "R.J." Johnson was bludgeoned to death by two inmates who were trying to escape. Both inmates were arrested within the confines of the prison grounds. They were subsequently sentenced to death.  A third convict was sentenced to life imprisonment for providing materials in the killing. The first convict, Eric Donald Robert, was executed successfully on October 16, 2012, using South Dakota's new single-drug lethal injection method. The second convict, Rodney Scott Berget, was executed on October 29, 2018.

Notable prisoners
 Elijah Page – convicted of the murder of Chester Poage; executed by lethal injection on July 11, 2007.
 Charles Russell Rhines – convicted of the murder of Donnivan Schaffer; executed by lethal injection on November 4, 2019.
 Briley Piper – convicted of the murder of Chester Poage; only person on death row in South Dakota.
 Darrell Hoadley – convicted of the murder of Chester Poage; serving a life sentence.
 William Kunnecke – a German-American serial killer. Serving a sentence of life imprisonment, he escaped on September 3, 1919, and was never captured.

References

External links
 South Dakota Department of Corrections
 https://web.archive.org/web/20100630235559/http://doc.sd.gov/adult/facilities/sdsp.aspx
 http://wikimapia.org/1223914/South-Dakota-State-Penitentiary
 https://web.archive.org/web/20100618121237/http://doc.sd.gov/images/pen3_001.jpg
 http://www.hopehaveninternationalministries.org/ClassLibrary/Page/Images/Data/261.jpg
 http://www.calvin.edu/worship/stories/images/restore_justice/South%20Dakota%20State%20Penitentiary.jpg

Prisons in South Dakota
Buildings and structures in Sioux Falls, South Dakota
Execution sites in the United States
1881 establishments in Dakota Territory